Kenneth M. Myers (born March 11, 1933) is a politician in the American state of Florida. He served in the Florida House of Representatives from 1965 to 1968, representing the 94th district. He served in the Florida Senate from 1968 to 1980.

References

1933 births
Living people
Members of the Florida House of Representatives
Florida state senators